United States presidents issue presidential memoranda, which are similar to executive orders and have the force of law on the Executive Branch, but are generally considered less prestigious. Presidential memoranda do not have an established process for issuance or publication; unlike executive orders, they are not numbered.

List

References

External links
 Federal Archives
 US Presidential Actions - Archived White House site
 Federal Register

 
Presidential memoranda,Obama
Presidential memoranda
Presidential memoranda